{{DISPLAYTITLE:C11H16BrNO2}}
The molecular formula C11H16BrNO2 (molar mass: 274.15 g/mol) may refer to:

 2,5-Dimethoxy-4-bromoamphetamine
 Meta-DOB

Molecular formulas